Herschbach may refer to:

Dudley R. Herschbach, American chemist
Herschbach, Selters, a municipality in the Verbandsgemeinde Selters, Westerwaldkreis, Rhineland-Palatinate, Germany
Herschbach, Wallmerod, a municipality in the Verbandsgemeinde Wallmerod, Westerwaldkreis, Rhineland-Palatinate, Germany